South Greenford railway station is in the London Borough of Ealing in west London, and is on the Greenford branch in Travelcard Zone 4. All trains serving South Greenford are operated by Great Western Railway.

The station is located on the A40, south of Greenford Green, north-east of Greenford Broadway, and just west of Perivale.

History
The Greenford branch of the Great Western Railway (GWR) had been used for regular passenger services since 1904, but the halt at South Greenford did not open until 20 September 1926.

The station's platforms were taken from Trumpers Crossing Halte railway station when it closed six months prior.

Originally named South Greenford Halt, the suffix was dropped on 5 May 1969.

At present, signage on the station carries, in smaller font, an alternative name for the station. The alternative name is "West Perivale".

Service and patronage

The normal service from the station runs every day except Sunday until about 22:00 with two trains per hour towards Greenford and two trains per hour to West Ealing, where there are connections to Paddington station via Ealing Broadway and to Heathrow Airport. The station is unmanned. Oyster "pay as you go" can be used for journeys to and from South Greenford.

As well as the passenger trains serving South Greenford, the Greenford branch also carries freight traffic, mainly waste and aggregates as well as some empty passenger stock movements.

In 2015/2016, it was ranked as the third least used station in Greater London with 62,184 entries and exits. As of 2018/2019, it is currently the least used station in London with 28,084 entries and exits.

Connections
London Buses route 95 serves the station.

References

External links

Railway stations in the London Borough of Ealing
DfT Category F2 stations
Former Great Western Railway stations
Railway stations in Great Britain opened in 1926
Railway stations served by Great Western Railway